Capital accumulation is the dynamic that motivates the pursuit of profit, involving the investment of money or any financial asset with the goal of increasing the initial monetary value of said asset as a financial return whether in the form of profit, rent, interest, royalties or capital gains. The aim of capital accumulation is to create new fixed and working capitals, broaden and modernize the existing ones, grow the material basis of social-cultural activities, as well as constituting the necessary resource for reserve and insurance. The process of capital accumulation forms the basis of capitalism, and is one of the defining characteristics of a capitalist economic system.

Definition

The definition of capital accumulation is subject to controversy and ambiguities, because it could refer to:
a net addition to existing wealth
a redistribution of wealth.
Most often, capital accumulation involves both a net addition and a redistribution of wealth, which may raise the question of who really benefits from it most. If more wealth is produced than there was before, a society becomes richer; the total stock of wealth increases. But if some accumulate capital only at the expense of others, wealth is merely shifted from A to B. It is also possible that some accumulate capital much faster than others. When one person is enriched at the expense of another in circumstances that the law sees as unjust it is called unjust enrichment. In principle, it is possible that a few people or organisations accumulate capital and grow richer, although the total stock of wealth of society decreases.

In economics and accounting, capital accumulation is often equated with investment of profit income or savings, especially in real capital goods. The concentration and centralisation of capital are two of the results of such accumulation (see below).

Capital accumulation refers ordinarily to:

real investment in tangible means of production, such as acquisitions, research and development, etc. that can increase the capital flow.
investment in financial assets represented on paper, yielding profit, interest, rent, royalties, fees or capital gains.
investment in non-productive physical assets such as residential real estate or works of art that appreciate in value.

and by extension to:

human capital, i.e., new education and training increasing the skills of the (potential) labour force which can increase earnings from work.
social capital, i.e. the wealth and productive capacity that the people in a society hold in common, rather than as individuals or corporations.
 etc.

Both non-financial and financial capital accumulation is usually needed for economic growth, since additional production usually requires additional funds to enlarge the scale of production. Smarter and more productive organization of production can also increase production without increased capital. Capital can be created without increased investment by inventions or improved organization that increase productivity, discoveries of new assets (oil, gold, minerals, etc.), the sale of property, etc.

In modern macroeconomics and econometrics the term capital formation is often used in preference to "accumulation", though the United Nations Conference on Trade and Development (UNCTAD) refers nowadays to "accumulation". The term is occasionally used in national accounts.

Measurement of accumulation

Accumulation can be measured as the monetary value of investments, the amount of income that is reinvested, or as the change in the value of assets owned (the increase in the value of the capital stock). Using company balance sheets, tax data and direct surveys as a basis, government statisticians estimate total investments and assets for the purpose of national accounts, national balance of payments and flow of funds statistics. Usually, the reserve banks and the Treasury provide interpretations and analysis of this data. Standard indicators include capital formation, gross fixed capital formation, fixed capital, household asset wealth, and foreign direct investment.

Organisations such as the International Monetary Fund, UNCTAD, the World Bank Group, the OECD, and the Bank for International Settlements used national investment data to estimate world trends. The Bureau of Economic Analysis, Eurostat and the Japan Statistical Office provide data on the US, Europe and Japan respectively.

Other useful sources of investment information are business magazines such as Fortune, Forbes, The Economist, Business Week, etc., and various corporate "watchdog" organisations and non-governmental organization publications. A reputable scientific journal is the Review of Income and Wealth. In the case of the US, the "Analytical Perspectives" document (an annex to the yearly budget) provides useful wealth and capital estimates applying to the whole country.

Demand-led growth models
In macroeconomics, following the Harrod–Domar model, the savings ratio and the capital coefficient are regarded as critical factors for accumulation and growth, assuming that all saving is used to finance fixed investment. The rate of growth of the real stock of fixed capital is:

where  is the real national income.

A country might, for example, save and invest 12% of its national income, and then if the capital coefficient is 4:1 (i.e. $4 billion must be invested to increase the national income by 1 billion) the rate of growth of the national income might be 3% annually. However, as Keynesian economics points out, savings do not automatically mean investment (as liquid funds may be hoarded for example). Investment may also not be investment in fixed capital (see above).

Assuming that the turnover of total production capital invested remains constant, the proportion of total investment which just maintains the stock of total capital, rather than enlarging it, will typically increase as the total stock increases. The growth rate of incomes and net new investments must then also increase, in order to accelerate the growth of the capital stock. Simply put, the bigger capital grows, the more capital it takes to keep it growing and the more markets must expand.

The Harrodian model has a problem of unstable static equilibrium, since if the growth rate is not equal to the Harrodian warranted rate, the production will tend to extreme points (infinite or zero production). The Neo-Kaleckians models do not suffer from the Harrodian instability but fails to deliver a convergence dynamic of the effective capacity utilization to the planned capacity utilization. For its turn, the model of the Sraffian Supermultiplier grants a static stable equilibrium and a convergence to the planned capacity utilization. The Sraffian Supermultiplier model diverges from the Harrodian model since it takes the investment as induced and not as autonomous. The autonomous components in this model are the Autonomous Non-Capacity Creating Expenditures, such as exports, credit led consumption and public spending. The growth rate of these expenditures determines the long run rate of capital accumulation and product growth.

Marxist concept

Marx borrowed the idea of capital accumulation or the concentration of capital from early socialist writers such as Charles Fourier, Louis Blanc, Victor Considerant, and Constantin Pecqueur.  In Karl Marx's critique of political economy, capital accumulation is the operation whereby profits are reinvested into the economy, increasing the total quantity of capital. Capital was understood by Marx to be expanding value, that is, in other terms, as a sum of capital, usually expressed in money, that is transformed through human labor into a larger value and extracted as profits. Here, capital is defined essentially as economic or commercial asset value that is used by capitalists to obtain additional value (surplus-value). This requires property relations which enable objects of value to be appropriated and owned, and trading rights to be established.

Over-accumulation and crisis
The Marxist analysis of capital accumulation and the development of capitalism identifies systemic issues with the process that arise with expansion of the productive forces. A crisis of overaccumulation of capital occurs when the rate of profit is greater than the rate of new profitable investment outlets in the economy, arising from increasing productivity from a rising organic composition of capital (higher capital input to labor input ratio). This depresses the wage bill, leading to stagnant wages and high rates of unemployment for the working class while excess profits search for new profitable investment opportunities. Marx believed that this cyclical process would be the fundamental cause for the dissolution of capitalism and its replacement by socialism, which would operate according to a different economic dynamic.

In Marxist thought, socialism would succeed capitalism as the dominant mode of production when the accumulation of capital can no longer sustain itself due to falling rates of profit in real production relative to increasing productivity. A socialist economy would not base production on the accumulation of capital, instead basing production on the criteria of satisfying human needs and directly producing use-values. This concept is encapsulated in the principle of production for use.

Concentration and centralization

According to Marx, capital has the tendency for concentration and centralization in the hands of richest capitalists. Marx explains:

"It is concentration of capitals already formed, destruction of their individual independence, expropriation of capitalist by capitalist, transformation of many small into few large capitals.... Capital grows in one place to a huge mass in a single hand, because it has in another place been lost by many.... The battle of competition is fought by cheapening of commodities. The cheapness of commodities demands, ceteris paribus, on the productiveness of labour, and this again on the scale of production. Therefore, the larger capitals beat the smaller. It will further be remembered that, with the development of the capitalist mode of production, there is an increase in the minimum amount of individual capital necessary to carry on a business under its normal conditions. The smaller capitals, therefore, crowd into spheres of production which Modern Industry has only sporadically or incompletely got hold of. Here competition rages.... It always ends in the ruin of many small capitalists, whose capitals partly pass into the hands of their conquerors, partly vanish."

Rate of accumulation

In Marxian economics, the rate of accumulation is defined as (1) the value of the real net increase in the stock of capital in an accounting period, (2) the proportion of realized surplus-value or profit-income which is reinvested, rather than consumed. This rate can be expressed by means of various ratios between the original capital outlay, the realized turnover, surplus-value or profit and reinvestment's (see, e.g., the writings of the economist Michał Kalecki).

Other things being equal, the greater the amount of profit-income that is disbursed as personal earnings and used for consumption purposes, the lower the savings rate and the lower the rate of accumulation is likely to be. However, earnings spent on consumption can also stimulate market demand and higher investment. This is the cause of endless controversies in economic theory about "how much to spend, and how much to save".

In a boom period of capitalism, the growth of investments is cumulative, i.e. one investment leads to another, leading to a constantly expanding market, an expanding labor force, and an increase in the standard of living for the majority of the people.

In a stagnating, decadent capitalism, the accumulation process is increasingly oriented towards investment on military and security forces, real estate, financial speculation, and luxury consumption. In that case, income from value-adding production will decline in favour of interest, rent and tax income, with as a corollary an increase in the level of permanent unemployment.

As a rule, the larger the total sum of capital invested, the higher the return on investment will be. The more capital one owns, the more capital one can also borrow and reinvest at a higher rate of profit or interest. The inverse is also true, and this is one factor in the widening gap between the rich and the poor.

Ernest Mandel emphasized that the rhythm of capital accumulation and growth depended critically on (1) the division of a society's social product between necessary product and surplus product, and (2) the division of the surplus product between investment and consumption. In turn, this allocation pattern reflected the outcome of competition among capitalists, competition between capitalists and workers, and competition between workers. The pattern of capital accumulation can therefore never be simply explained by commercial factors, it also involved social factors and power relationships.

Circuit of capital accumulation from production

Strictly speaking, capital has accumulated only when realized profit income has been reinvested in capital assets. But the process of capital accumulation in production has, as suggested in the first volume of Marx's Das Kapital, at least seven distinct but linked moments:

The initial investment of capital (which could be borrowed capital) in means of production and labor power.
The command over surplus labour and its appropriation.
The valorisation (increase in value) of capital through production of new outputs.
The appropriation of the new output produced by employees, containing the added value.
The realisation of surplus-value through output sales.
The appropriation of realised surplus-value as (profit) income after deduction of costs.
The reinvestment of profit income in production.

All of these moments do not refer simply to an economic or commercial process. Rather, they assume the existence of legal, social, cultural and economic power conditions, without which creation, distribution and circulation of the new wealth could not occur. This becomes especially clear when the attempt is made to create a market where none exists, or where people refuse to trade.

In fact Marx argues that the original or primitive accumulation of capital often occurs through violence, plunder, slavery, robbery, extortion and theft. He argues that the capitalist mode of production requires that people be forced to work in value-adding production for someone else, and for this purpose, they must be cut off from sources of income other than selling their labor power.

Simple and expanded reproduction

In volume 2 of Das Kapital, Marx continues the story and shows that, with the aid of bank credit, capital in search of growth can more or less smoothly mutate from one form to another, alternately taking the form of money capital (liquid deposits, securities, etc.), commodity capital (tradeable products, real estate etc.), or production capital (means of production and labor power).

His discussion of the simple and expanded reproduction of the conditions of production offers a more sophisticated model of the parameters of the accumulation process as a whole. At simple reproduction, a sufficient amount is produced to sustain society at the given living standard; the stock of capital stays constant. At expanded reproduction, more product-value is produced than is necessary to sustain society at a given living standard (a surplus product); the additional product-value is available for investments which enlarge the scale and variety of production.

The bourgeois claim there is no economic law according to which capital is necessarily re-invested in the expansion of production, that such depends on anticipated profitability, market expectations and perceptions of investment risk. Such statements only explain the subjective experiences of investors and ignore the objective realities which would influence such opinions. As Marx states in Vol.2, simple reproduction only exists if the variable and surplus capital realized by Dept. 1—producers of means of production—exactly equals that of the constant capital of Dept. 2, producers of articles of consumption (pg 524). Such equilibrium rests on various assumptions, such as a constant labor supply (no population growth). Accumulation does not imply a necessary change in total magnitude of value produced but can simply refer to a change in the composition of an industry (pg. 514).

Ernest Mandel introduced the additional concept of contracted economic reproduction, i.e. reduced accumulation where business operating at a loss outnumbers growing business, or economic reproduction on a decreasing scale, for example due to wars, natural disasters or devalorisation.

Balanced economic growth requires that different factors in the accumulation process expand in appropriate proportions. But markets themselves cannot spontaneously create that balance, in fact what drives business activity is precisely the imbalances between supply and demand: inequality is the motor of growth. This partly explains why the worldwide pattern of economic growth is very uneven and unequal, even although markets have existed almost everywhere for a very long time. Some people argue that it also explains government regulation of market trade and protectionism.

Origins
According to Marx, capital accumulation has a double origin, namely in trade and in expropriation, both of a legal or illegal kind. The reason is that a stock of capital can be increased through a process of exchange or "trading up" but also through directly taking an asset or resource from someone else, without compensation. David Harvey calls this accumulation by dispossession. Marx does not discuss gifts and grants as a source of capital accumulation, nor does he analyze taxation in detail (he could not, as he died even before completing his major book, Das Kapital). Nowadays the tax take is often so large (i.e., 25-40% of GDP)  that some authors  refer to state capitalism. This gives rise to a proliferation of tax havens to evade tax liability.

The continuation and progress of capital accumulation depends on the removal of obstacles to the expansion of trade, and this has historically often been a violent process. As markets expand, more and more new opportunities develop for accumulating capital, because more and more types of goods and services can be traded in. But capital accumulation may also confront resistance, when people refuse to sell, or refuse to buy (for example a strike by investors or workers, or consumer resistance).

Capital accumulation as social relation

"Accumulation of capital" sometimes also refers in Marxist writings to the reproduction of capitalist social relations (institutions) on a larger scale over time, i.e., the expansion of the size of the proletariat and of the wealth owned by the bourgeoisie.

This interpretation emphasizes that capital ownership, predicated on command over labor, is a social relation: the growth of capital implies the growth of the working class (a "law of accumulation"). In the first volume of Das Kapital Marx had illustrated this idea with reference to Edward Gibbon Wakefield's theory of colonisation:

In the third volume of Das Kapital, Marx refers to the "fetishism of capital" reaching its highest point with interest-bearing capital, because now capital seems to grow of its own accord without anybody doing anything. In this case,

Markets with social influence 
Product recommendations and information about past purchases have been shown to influence consumers choices significantly whether it is for music, movie, book, technological, and other type of products. Social influence often induces a rich-get-richer phenomenon (Matthew effect) where popular products tend to become even more popular.

See also

Business cycle
Capitalist mode of production (Marxist theory)
Charity (practice)
Commodity fetishism
Constant purchasing power accounting
Culture of capitalism
Dual-sector model
History of capitalist theory
Internal contradictions of capital accumulation
Investment-specific technological progress
Matthew effect
Preferential attachment
Prices of production
Primitive socialist accumulation
Productive and unproductive labour
Proletarianization
Property income
Relations of production
Return on capital
Simple commodity production
Surplus value
The rich get richer and the poor get poorer
Unearned income
Unequal exchange
Value investing

Notes

References

Michel Aglietta, A Theory of Capitalist Regulation.
Elmar Altvater, Gesellschaftliche Produktion und ökonomische Rationalität; Externe Effekte und zentrale Planung im Wirtschaftssystem des Sozialismus.
Samir Amin, Accumulation on a World Scale.
Philip Armstrong, Andrew Glyn and John Harrison, Capitalism since World War II. Das Kapital: Vol. 1, Part 7 and Vol. 2, Part 3.'s Environmental Crisis: An Inquiry into the Limits of National Development. Armonk: M.E. Sharpe, 1992.
Hernando de Soto, The Mystery of Capital: Why Capitalism Triumphs in the West and Fails Everywhere Else.
Manuel G. Velasquez, Business Ethics: Concepts and Cases.''

External links

 Growth, Accumulation, Crisis: With New Macroeconomic Data for Sweden 1800-2000 by Rodney Edvinsson
David Harvey, Reading Marx's Capital, Reading Marx’s Capital - Class 11, Chapter 25, The General Law of Capitalist Accumulation (video lecture)

Capital (economics)
Economic growth
Marxian economics
Capitalism